Bavarians may refer to:

 Bavarians, the people of the federal state of Bavaria
 Bavarii, a 6th-century term for Bavarians